The 1996 Los Angeles Dodgers season was the 107th for the franchise in Major League Baseball, and their 39th season in Los Angeles, California. The Dodgers were atop the standings for a substantial part of the season, albeit under two managers. Longtime manager Tommy Lasorda suffered a heart attack in late June and had to step down. Bill Russell, Lasorda's bench coach and a former Dodger player, was chosen to manage the rest of the season.

The Dodgers went into the final weekend of the season with a two-game lead on the San Diego Padres, needing only to win one of the final three games with the Padres to clinch the National League Western Division crown. However, the Padres swept them, and the Dodgers limped into the playoffs as a Wild Card team. The Dodgers were swept by the Atlanta Braves in the National League Division Series.

The Dodgers used 15 different pitchers during the season, the fewest of any MLB team in 1996.

Offseason
November 29, 1995: Acquired Mike Blowers from the Seattle Mariners for Miguel Cairo and Willie Otanez.
December 15, 1995: Acquired Rick Clelland from the Montreal Expos for Omar Daal.
December 17, 1995: Acquired Billy Brewer from the Kansas City Royals for José Offerman.

Regular season

Season standings

Record vs. opponents

Game log

|- bgcolor="ccffcc"
| 1 || April 1 || @ Astros || 4–3 || Martinez (1–0) || Reynolds || Worrell (1) || 34,375 || 1–0
|- bgcolor="ffbbbb"
| 2 || April 2 || @ Astros || 4–5 || Jones || Cummings (0–1) || — || 20,492 || 1–1
|- bgcolor="ffbbbb"
| 3 || April 3 || @ Astros || 2–5 || Hampton || Nomo (0–1) || Jones || 14,858 || 1–2
|- bgcolor="ffbbbb"
| 4 || April 4 || @ Cubs || 4–9 || Foster || Astacio (0–1) || — || 12,626 || 1–3
|- bgcolor="ffbbbb"
| 5 || April 5 || @ Cubs || 1–11 || Bullinger || Candiotti (0–1) || — || 19,324 || 1–4
|- bgcolor="ccffcc"
| 6 || April 6 || @ Cubs || 3–1 || Park (1–0) || Navarro || Worrell (2) || 24,428 || 2–4
|- bgcolor="ffbbbb"
| 7 || April 7 || @ Cubs || 4–5 || Jones || Osuna (0–1) || — || 19,002 || 2–5
|- bgcolor="ccffcc"
| 8 || April 8 || Braves || 1–0 || Nomo (1–1) || Glavine || — || 53,180 || 3–5
|- bgcolor="ffbbbb"
| 9 || April 9 || Braves || 1–3 || Smoltz || Astacio (0–2) || Wohlers || 35,570 || 3–6
|- bgcolor="ccffcc"
| 10 || April 10 || Braves || 9–2 || Candiotti (1–1) || Avery || — || 48,194 || 4–6
|- bgcolor="ccffcc"
| 11 || April 11 || Marlins || 5–0 || Park (2–0) || Brown || Worrell (3) || 36,023 || 5–6
|- bgcolor="ffbbbb"
| 12 || April 12 || Marlins || 1–3 || Burkett || Valdez (0–1) || — || 40,343 || 5–7
|- bgcolor="ccffcc"
| 13 || April 13 || Marlins || 3–1 || Nomo (2–1) || Hammond || — || 46,059 || 6–7
|- bgcolor="ccffcc"
| 14 || April 14 || Marlins || 6–1 || Astacio (1–2) || Leiter || — || 49,728 || 7–7
|- bgcolor="ffbbbb"
| 15 || April 16 || @ Giants || 3–5 || Dewey || Osuna (0–2) || Beck || 19,716 || 7–8
|- bgcolor="ccffcc"
| 16 || April 17 || @ Giants || 11–2 || Osuna (1–2) || Leiter || — || 17,039 || 8–8
|- bgcolor="ffbbbb"
| 17 || April 19 || @ Marlins || 0–5 || Powell || Hall (0–1) || — || 24,143 || 8–9
|- bgcolor="ffbbbb"
| 18 || April 20 || @ Marlins || 4–7 || Leiter || Nomo (2–2) || Nen || 35,542 || 8–10
|- bgcolor="ffbbbb"
| 19 || April 21 || @ Marlins || 4–5 || Brown || Hall (0–2) || Mathews || 23,842 || 8–11
|- bgcolor="ffbbbb"
| 20 || April 22 || @ Braves || 1–4 || Maddux || Candiotti (1–2) || — || 33,080 || 8–12
|- bgcolor="ccffcc"
| 21 || April 23 || @ Braves || 3–2 || Osuna (2–2) || Clontz || Worrell (4) || 30,475 || 9–12
|- bgcolor="ccffcc"
| 22 || April 24 || Astros || 5–2 || Valdez (1–1) || Brocail || — || 26,666 || 10–12
|- bgcolor="ccffcc"
| 23 || April 25 || Astros || 6–4 || Nomo (3–2) || Drabek || Worrell (5) || 33,530 || 11–12
|- bgcolor="ccffcc"
| 24 || April 26 || Cubs || 1–0 || Astacio (2–2) || Trachsel || Worrell (6) || 31,172 || 12–12
|- bgcolor="ffbbbb"
| 25 || April 27 || Cubs || 3–4 (10) || Navarro || Osuna (2–3) || Jones || 43,519 || 12–13
|- bgcolor="ffbbbb"
| 26 || April 28 || Cubs || 0–3 || Castillo || Park (2–1) || — || 45,441 || 12–14
|- bgcolor="ccffcc"
| 27 || April 29 || Cubs || 10–4 || Valdez (2–1) || Foster || — || 39,003 || 13–14
|- bgcolor="ccffcc"
| 28 || April 30 || Rockies || 7–4 || Nomo (4–2) || Ritz || Worrell (7) || 31,037 || 14–14
|-

|- bgcolor="ffbbbb"
| 29 || May 1 || Rockies || 1–4 || Thompson || Astacio (2–3) || Ruffin || 30,377 || 14–15
|- bgcolor="ccffcc"
| 30 || May 3 || @ Pirates || 10–1 || Park (3–1) || Darwin || — || 18,268 || 15–15
|- bgcolor="ffbbbb"
| 31 || May 4 || @ Pirates || 2–7 || Wagner || Candiotti (1–3) || — || 20,321 || 15–16
|- bgcolor="ffbbbb"
| 32 || May 5 || @ Pirates || 2–4 || Neagle || Valdez (2–2) || Plesac || 19,206 || 15–17
|- bgcolor="ccffcc"
| 33 || May 6 || @ Pirates || 8–4 || Nomo (5–2) || Hope || Radinsky (1) || 9,415 || 16–17
|- bgcolor="ffbbbb"
| 34 || May 7 || @ Reds || 2–3 (12) || Moore || Worrell (0–1) || — || 18,147 || 16–18
|- bgcolor="ffbbbb"
| 35 || May 8 || @ Reds || 0–5 || Schourek || Park (3–2) || Shaw || 17,820 || 16–19
|- bgcolor="ccffcc"
| 36 || May 10 || @ Cardinals || 3–2 (12) || Worrell (1–1) || Eckersley || — || 36,821 || 17–19
|- bgcolor="ccffcc"
| 37 || May 11 || @ Cardinals || 4–2 || Valdez (3–2) || Benes || Worrell (8) || 38,008 || 18–19
|- bgcolor="ffbbbb"
| 38 || May 12 || @ Cardinals || 5–6 || Petkovsek || Nomo (5–3) || Eckersley || 38,549 || 18–20
|- bgcolor="ffbbbb"
| 39 || May 13 || Expos || 2–3 || Manuel || Worrell (1–2) || Rojas || 25,600 || 18–21
|- bgcolor="ccffcc"
| 40 || May 14 || Expos || 2–1 || Martinez (2–0) || Veres || Worrell (9) || 37,942 || 19–21
|- bgcolor="ccffcc"
| 41 || May 15 || Expos || 7–2 || Candiotti (2–3) || Fassero || — || 26,875 || 20–21
|- bgcolor="ccffcc"
| 42 || May 16 || Phillies || 8–2 || Valdez (4–2) || Mimbs || — || 25,960 || 21–21
|- bgcolor="ccffcc"
| 43 || May 17 || Phillies || 6–3 || Nomo (6–3) || Grace || Worrell (10) || 54,304 || 22–21
|- bgcolor="ccffcc"
| 44 || May 18 || Phillies || 7–2 || Astacio (3–3) || Fernandez || Osuna (1) || 51,064 || 23–21
|- bgcolor="ffbbbb"
| 45 || May 19 || Phillies || 4–5 || Leiper || Radinsky (0–1) || Bottalico || 38,178 || 23–22
|- bgcolor="ffbbbb"
| 46 || May 20 || Mets || 1–7 || Jones || Candiotti (2–4) || — || 26,625 || 23–23
|- bgcolor="ccffcc"
| 47 || May 21 || Mets || 6–4 || Valdez (5–2) || Harnisch || Worrell (11) || 27,158 || 24–23
|- bgcolor="ffbbbb"
| 48 || May 22 || Mets || 2–3 || Clark || Nomo (6–4) || Franco || 33,716 || 24–24
|- bgcolor="ccffcc"
| 49 || May 24 || @ Expos || 5–4 (11) || Osuna (3–3) || Daal || Worrell (12) || 27,843 || 25–24
|- bgcolor="ccffcc"
| 50 || May 25 || @ Expos || 5–3 || Martinez (3–0) || Cormier || Worrell (13) || 27,104 || 26–24
|- bgcolor="ccffcc"
| 51 || May 26 || @ Expos || 4–3 || Candiotti (3–4) || Rojas || Worrell (14) || 30,718 || 27–24
|- bgcolor="ffbbbb"
| 52 || May 28 || @ Phillies || 3–9 || Grace || Valdez (5–3) || — || 17,186 || 27–25
|- bgcolor="ccffcc"
| 53 || May 29 || @ Phillies || 3–2 (11) || Guthrie (1–0) || Bottalico || Worrell (15) || 24,120 || 28–25
|- bgcolor="ffbbbb"
| 54 || May 30 || @ Phillies || 2–3 || Borland || Worrell (1–3) || — || 29,287 || 28–26
|- bgcolor="ccffcc"
| 55 || May 31 || @ Mets || 10–3 || Martinez (4–0) || Jones || — || 19,793 || 29–26
|-

|- bgcolor="ffbbbb"
| 56 || June 1 || @ Mets || 3–4 || Harnisch || Candiotti (3–5) || Franco || 26,445 || 29–27
|- bgcolor="ccffcc"
| 57 || June 2 || @ Mets || 1–0 || Valdez (6–3) || Clark || Worrell (16) || 39,328 || 30–27
|- bgcolor="ffbbbb"
| 58 || June 4 || Pirates || 0–3 || Darwin || Nomo (6–5) || Cordova || 29,576 || 30–28
|- bgcolor="ffbbbb"
| 59 || June 5 || Pirates || 3–7 || Wilkins || Astacio (3–4) || Cordova || 32,161 || 30–29
|- bgcolor="ccffcc"
| 60 || June 6 || Pirates || 8–3 || Candiotti (4–5) || Miceli || — || 26,664 || 31–29
|- bgcolor="ffbbbb"
| 61 || June 7 || Reds || 1–2 || Smiley || Valdez (6–4) || Brantley || 35,197 || 31–30
|- bgcolor="ccffcc"
| 62 || June 8 || Reds || 5–4 (10) || Worrell (2–3) || Carrasco || — || 44,575 || 32–30
|- bgcolor="ccffcc"
| 63 || June 9 || Reds || 3–2 || Nomo (7–5) || Smith || Worrell (17) || 47,847 || 33–30
|- bgcolor="ccffcc"
| 64 || June 10 || Cardinals || 2–1 || Park (4–2) || Morgan || Osuna (2) || 54,043 || 34–30
|- bgcolor="ffbbbb"
| 65 || June 11 || Cardinals || 3–6 || Osborne || Martinez (4–1) || Honeycutt || 29,096 || 34–31
|- bgcolor="ccffcc"
| 66 || June 13 || @ Braves || 6–3 || Valdez (7–4) || Glavine || Worrell (18) || 39,463 || 35–31
|- bgcolor="ffbbbb"
| 67 || June 14 || @ Braves || 1–3 || Smoltz || Astacio (3–5) || Wohlers || 45,389 || 35–32
|- bgcolor="ccffcc"
| 68 || June 15 || @ Braves || 6–2 || Nomo (8–5) || Avery || Worrell (19) || 49,726 || 36–32
|- bgcolor="ccffcc"
| 69 || June 16 || @ Braves || 3–2 || Candiotti (5–5) || Schmidt || Worrell (20) || 44,784 || 37–32
|- bgcolor="ccffcc"
| 70 || June 18 || @ Cubs || 9–6 || Martinez (5–1) || Telemaco || Worrell (21) || — || 38–32
|- bgcolor="ffbbbb"
| 71 || June 18 || @ Cubs || 4–7 || Campbell || Valdez (7–5) || — || 23,362 || 38–33
|- bgcolor="ccffcc"
| 72 || June 19 || @ Cubs || 4–3 (13) || Park (5–2) || Adams || Worrell (22) || 28,477 || 39–33
|- bgcolor="ffbbbb"
| 73 || June 20 || Astros || 2–4 || Wall || Nomo (8–6) || Jones || 49,656 || 39–34
|- bgcolor="ffbbbb"
| 74 || June 21 || Astros || 3–11 || Drabek || Candiotti (5–6) || — || 33,273 || 39–35
|- bgcolor="ccffcc"
| 75 || June 22 || Astros || 3–0 || Martinez (6–1) || Reynolds || — || 37,844 || 40–35
|- bgcolor="ccffcc"
| 76 || June 23 || Astros || 4–3 || Worrell (3–3) || Hernandez || — || 35,467 || 41–35
|- bgcolor="ffbbbb"
| 77 || June 25 || Cubs || 0–2 || Trachsel || Nomo (8–7) || — || 37,448 || 41–36
|- bgcolor="ffbbbb"
| 78 || June 26 || Cubs || 4–6 || Navarro || Candiotti (5–7) || Adams || 35,200 || 41–37
|- bgcolor="ffbbbb"
| 79 || June 27 || @ Rockies || 1–13 || Ritz || Astacio (3–6) || — || 48,043 || 41–38
|- bgcolor="ffbbbb"
| 80 || June 28 || @ Rockies || 4–13 || Freeman || Martinez (6–2) || — || 48,025 || 41–39
|- bgcolor="ccffcc"
| 81 || June 29 || @ Rockies || 13–10 || Valdez (8–5) || Rekar || — || 48,009 || 42–39
|- bgcolor="ffbbbb"
| 82 || June 30 || @ Rockies || 15–16 || Ruffin || Worrell (3–4) || — || 48,103 || 42–40
|-

|- bgcolor="ccffcc"
| 83 || July 1 || @ Padres || 10–2 || Candiotti (6–7) || Worrell || — || 40,343 || 43–40
|- bgcolor="ccffcc"
| 84 || July 2 || @ Padres || 7–3 || Astacio (4–6) || Valenzuela || — || 28,294 || 44–40
|- bgcolor="ffbbbb"
| 85 || July 3 || @ Padres || 2–3 || Hamilton || Martinez (6–3) || Hoffman || 48,841 || 44–41
|- bgcolor="ccffcc"
| 86 || July 4 || Rockies || 9–4 || Valdez (9–5) || Freeman || — || 54,331 || 45–41
|- bgcolor="ccffcc"
| 87 || July 5 || Rockies || 8–1 || Nomo (9–7) || Bailey || — || 43,415 || 46–41
|- bgcolor="ccffcc"
| 88 || July 6 || Rockies || 3–2 || Osuna (4–3) || Ruffin || Worrell (23) || 35,562 || 47–41
|- bgcolor="ffbbbb"
| 89 || July 7 || Rockies || 0–3 || Ritz || Astacio (4–7) || — || 38,269 || 47–42
|- bgcolor="ccffcc"
| 90 || July 11 || Giants || 8–3 || Martinez (7–3) || Leiter || — || 37,305 || 48–42
|- bgcolor="ccffcc"
| 91 || July 12 || Giants || 6–1 || Valdez (10–5) || Fernandez || — || 44,569 || 49–42
|- bgcolor="ffbbbb"
| 92 || July 13 || Giants || 0–7 || Estes || Nomo (9–8) || — || 54,226 || 49–43
|- bgcolor="ffbbbb"
| 93 || July 14 || Giants || 0–6 || VanLandingham || Park (5–3) || — || 42,862 || 49–44
|- bgcolor="ccffcc"
| 94 || July 15 || Padres || 1–0 (10) || Guthrie (2–0) || Hoffman || — || 44,368 || 50–44
|- bgcolor="ffbbbb"
| 95 || July 16 || Padres || 1–10 || Tewksbury || Martinez (7–4) || Worrell || 52,436 || 50–45
|- bgcolor="ffbbbb"
| 96 || July 17 || Padres || 4–5 || Florie || Osuna (4–4) || Hoffman || 42,423 || 50–46
|- bgcolor="ccffcc"
| 97 || July 18 || @ Giants || 8–3 || Nomo (10–8) || Estes || — || 28,072 || 51–46
|- bgcolor="ffbbbb"
| 98 || July 19 || @ Giants || 4–5 || VanLandingham || Candiotti (6–8) || Beck || 27,562 || 51–47
|- bgcolor="ffbbbb"
| 99 || July 20 || @ Giants || 6–7 || Bautista || Worrell (3–5) || — || 50,014 || 51–48
|- bgcolor="ccffcc"
| 100 || July 21 || @ Giants || 7–6 || Osuna (5–4) || DeLucia || Worrell (25) || 36,345 || 52–48
|- bgcolor="ccffcc"
| 101 || July 23 || @ Marlins || 7–1 || Valdez (11–5) || Leiter || — || 17,889 || 53–48
|- bgcolor="ffbbbb"
| 102 || July 24 || @ Marlins || 0–3 || Brown || Nomo (10–9) || Nen || 20,486 || 53–49
|- bgcolor="ccffcc"
| 103 || July 25 || @ Marlins || 6–3 || Astacio (5–7) || Hammond || Worrell (26) || 18,151 || 54–49
|- bgcolor="ffbbbb"
| 104 || July 26 || @ Astros || 3–4 || Darwin || Guthrie (2–1) || Wagner || 27,089 || 54–50
|- bgcolor="ccffcc"
| 105 || July 27 || @ Astros || 6–5 (11) || Osuna (6–4) || Clark || Worrell (27) || 36,841 || 55–50
|- bgcolor="ffbbbb"
| 106 || July 28 || @ Astros || 2–3 || Darwin || Eischen (0–1) || — || 32,912 || 55–51
|- bgcolor="ccffcc"
| 107 || July 30 || Marlins || 5–4 (10) || Osuna (7–4) || Weathers || — || 34,973 || 56–51
|- bgcolor="ccffcc"
| 108 || July 31 || Marlins || 3–0 || Martinez (8–4) || Rapp || Worrell (28) || 29,565 || 57–51
|-

|- bgcolor="ffbbbb"
| 109 || August 1 || Marlins || 6–7 (14) || Hammond || Dreifort (0–1) || Mathews || 41,197 || 57–52
|- bgcolor="ccffcc"
| 110 || August 2 || Braves || 2–1 || Radinsky (1–1) || Smoltz || Guthrie (1) || 49,012 || 58–52
|- bgcolor="ffbbbb"
| 111 || August 3 || Braves || 3–5 (18) || Woodall || Martinez (8–5) || — || 42,575 || 58–53
|- bgcolor="ffbbbb"
| 112 || August 4 || Braves || 4–6 || Borbon || Guthrie (2–2) || Wohlers || 45,903 || 58–54
|- bgcolor="ccffcc"
| 113 || August 6 || @ Pirates || 3–1 || Astacio (6–7) || Parris || Worrell (29) || 11,824 || 59–54
|- bgcolor="ffbbbb"
| 114 || August 7 || @ Pirates || 2–12 || Lieber || Martinez (8–6) || Wilkins || 12,232 || 59–55
|- bgcolor="ffbbbb"
| 115 || August 9 || @ Reds || 4–9 || Portugal || Valdez (11–6) || — || 34,004 || 59–56
|- bgcolor="ccffcc"
| 116 || August 10 || @ Reds || 7–5 || Nomo (11–9) || Burba || Worrell (30) || 33,830 || 60–56
|- bgcolor="ccffcc"
| 117 || August 11 || @ Reds || 10–5 || Osuna (8–4) || Carrasco || — || 27,897 || 61–56
|- bgcolor="ccffcc"
| 118 || August 12 || @ Reds || 6–5 || Martinez (9–6) || Smiley || Worrell (31) || 21,677 || 62–56
|- bgcolor="ccffcc"
| 119 || August 13 || @ Cardinals || 8–4 || Candiotti (7–8) || Stottlemyre || — || 30,761 || 63–56
|- bgcolor="ffbbbb"
| 120 || August 14 || @ Cardinals || 1–6 || Benes || Valdez (11–7) || — || 26,945 || 63–57
|- bgcolor="ccffcc"
| 121 || August 15 || @ Cardinals || 5–2 || Nomo (12–9) || Morgan || Worrell (32) || 32,930 || 64–57
|- bgcolor="ccffcc"
| 122 || August 16 || Expos || 8–2 || Astacio (7–7) || Urbina || — || 51,573 || 65–57
|- bgcolor="ccffcc"
| 123 || August 17 || Expos || 7–6 || Worrell (4–5) || Veres || — || 47,549 || 66–57
|- bgcolor="ffbbbb"
| 124 || August 18 || Expos || 3–7 || Leiter || Candiotti (7–9) || — || 36,673 || 66–58
|- bgcolor="ffbbbb"
| 125 || August 20 || Phillies || 1–3 || Jordan || Osuna (8–5) || Bottalico || 35,457 || 66–59
|- bgcolor="ffbbbb"
| 126 || August 21 || Phillies || 0–6 || Schilling || Nomo (12–10) || — || 39,502 || 66–60
|- bgcolor="ccffcc"
| 127 || August 22 || Phillies || 8–5 || Astacio (8–7) || Williams || Worrell (33) || 29,608 || 67–60
|- bgcolor="ccffcc"
| 128 || August 23 || Mets || 7–5 || Martinez (10–6) || Clark || Worrell (34) || 36,909 || 68–60
|- bgcolor="ccffcc"
| 129 || August 24 || Mets || 7–5 || Candiotti (8–9) || Wilson || Worrell (35) || 33,201 || 69–60
|- bgcolor="ccffcc"
| 130 || August 25 || Mets || 6–5 || Radinsky (2–1) || Franco || Worrell (36) || 39,056 || 70–60
|- bgcolor="ccffcc"
| 131 || August 27 || @ Expos || 5–1 || Nomo (13–10) || Fassero || — || 21,040 || 71–60
|- bgcolor="ffbbbb"
| 132 || August 28 || @ Expos || 5–6 || Rojas || Park (5–4) || — || 13,006 || 71–61
|- bgcolor="ccffcc"
| 133 || August 29 || @ Expos || 2–1 || Martinez (11–6) || Martinez || Worrell (37) || 16,551 || 72–61
|- bgcolor="ccffcc"
| 134 || August 30 || @ Phillies || 7–6 (12) || Dreifort (1–1) || Parrett || Worrell (38) || 22,129 || 73–61
|- bgcolor="ccffcc"
| 135 || August 31 || @ Phillies || 11–7 || Valdez (12–7) || Schilling || Osuna (3) || 24,821 || 74–61
|-

|- bgcolor="ffbbbb"
| 136 || September 1 || @ Phillies || 3–6 || Williams || Worrell (4–6) || Bottalico || 24,959 || 74–62
|- bgcolor="ccffcc"
| 137 || September 2 || @ Mets || 8–5 || Astacio (9–7) || Clark || Worrell (39) || 19,658 || 75–62
|- bgcolor="ccffcc"
| 138 || September 3 || @ Mets || 7–6 || Radinsky (3–1) || Henry || — || 15,646 || 76–62
|- bgcolor="ffbbbb"
| 139 || September 4 || @ Mets || 2–3 (12) || Wallace || Dreifort (1–2) || — || 15,662 || 76–63
|- bgcolor="ccffcc"
| 140 || September 6 || Pirates || 2–1 || Osuna (9–5) || Wilkins || Worrell (40) || 41,509 || 77–63
|- bgcolor="ccffcc"
| 141 || September 7 || Pirates || 4–3 || Nomo (14–10) || Schmidt || Worrell (41) || 50,862 || 78–63
|- bgcolor="ffbbbb"
| 142 || September 8 || Pirates || 1–4 || Plesac || Dreifort (1–3) || Ericks || 33,922 || 78–64
|- bgcolor="ccffcc"
| 143 || September 9 || Reds || 7–2 || Martinez (12–6) || Jarvis || — || 29,081 || 79–64
|- bgcolor="ccffcc"
| 144 || September 10 || Reds || 5–4 || Candiotti (9–9) || Salkeld || Worrell (42) || 28,237 || 80–64
|- bgcolor="ccffcc"
| 145 || September 11 || Reds || 3–2 || Valdez (13–7) || Smiley || Worrell (43) || 27,527 || 81–64
|- bgcolor="ccffcc"
| 146 || September 12 || Cardinals || 4–1 || Nomo (15–10) || Osborne || Osuna (4) || 34,191 || 82–64
|- bgcolor="ffbbbb"
| 147 || September 13 || Cardinals || 0–2 || Batchelor || Guthrie (2–3) || Eckersley || 36,657 || 82–65
|- bgcolor="ccffcc"
| 148 || September 14 || Cardinals || 9–5 || Martinez (13–6) || Benes || — || 44,548 || 83–65
|- bgcolor="ccffcc"
| 149 || September 15 || Cardinals || 6–5 || Radinsky (4–1) || Eckersley || Worrell (44) || 35,803 || 84–65
|- bgcolor="ccffcc"
| 150 || September 16 || @ Rockies || 6–4 || Valdez (14–7) || Wright || — || 48,013 || 85–65
|- bgcolor="ccffcc"
| 151 || September 17 || @ Rockies || 9–0 || Nomo (16–10) || Swift || — || 50,066 || 86–65
|- bgcolor="ffbbbb"
| 152 || September 18 || @ Rockies || 4–6 || Burke || Astacio (9–8) || Ruffin || 50,053 || 86–66
|- bgcolor="ccffcc"
| 153 || September 19 || @ Padres || 7–0 || Martinez (14–6) || Valenzuela || — || 41,287 || 87–66
|- bgcolor="ffbbbb"
| 154 || September 20 || @ Padres || 2–4 || Hamilton || Candiotti (9–10) || Hoffman || 51,217 || 87–67
|- bgcolor="ccffcc"
| 155 || September 21 || @ Padres || 9–2 || Valdez (15–7) || Sanders || — || 53,629 || 88–67
|- bgcolor="ffbbbb"
| 156 || September 22 || @ Padres || 2–3 || Ashby || Nomo (16–11) || Hoffman || 51,092 || 88–68
|- bgcolor="ccffcc"
| 157 || September 24 || Giants || 6–2 || Martinez (15–6) || Watson || — || 37,448 || 89–68
|- bgcolor="ccffcc"
| 158 || September 25 || Giants || 7–5 || Radinsky (5–1) || DeLucia || Worrell (45) || 42,405 || 90–68
|- bgcolor="ffbbbb"
| 159 || September 26 || Giants || 1–6 || Gardner || Candiotti (9–11) || — || 38,893 || 90–69
|- bgcolor="ffbbbb"
| 160 || September 27 || Padres || 2–5 (10) || Worrell || Osuna (9–6) || Hoffman || 53,294 || 90–70
|- bgcolor="ffbbbb"
| 161 || September 28 || Padres || 2–4 || Worrell || Dreifort (1–4) || Hoffman || 52,977 || 90–71
|- bgcolor="ffbbbb"
| 162 || September 29 || Padres || 0–2 (11) || Veras || Park (5–5) || Hoffman || 53,270 || 90–72
|-

|-
| Legend:       = Win       = LossBold = Dodgers team member

Detailed records

Opening Day lineup

Notable Transactions
July 31, 1996: Acquired Chad Curtis from the Detroit Tigers for Joey Eischen and John Cummings
August 31, 1996: Acquired Dave Clark from the Pittsburgh Pirates for Carl South
October 30, 1996: Chip Hale signed as a free agent with the Los Angeles Dodgers.

Roster

Starting Pitchers stats
Note: G = Games pitched; GS = Games started; IP = Innings pitched; W/L = Wins/Losses; ERA = Earned run average; BB = Walks allowed; SO = Strikeouts; CG = Complete games

Relief Pitchers stats
Note: G = Games pitched; GS = Games started; IP = Innings pitched; W/L = Wins/Losses; ERA = Earned run average; BB = Walks allowed; SO = Strikeouts; SV = Saves

Batting Stats
Note: Pos = Position; G = Games played; AB = At bats; Avg. = Batting average; R = Runs scored; H = Hits; HR = Home runs; RBI = Runs batted in; SB = Stolen bases

1996 Playoffs

1996 National League Division Series
The 1996 National League Division Series was played between Los Angeles Dodgers and Atlanta Braves.  Atlanta ended up winning the series 3-0.

Game 1, October 2
Dodger Stadium, Los Angeles

Game 2, October 3
Dodger Stadium, Los Angeles

Game 3, October 5
Atlanta–Fulton County Stadium, Atlanta

1996 Awards
1996 Major League Baseball All-Star Game
Mike Piazza starter
Todd Worrell reserve
 Rookie of the Year Award
Todd Hollandsworth
All-Star Game MVP Award
Mike Piazza
TSN National League All-Star
Mike Piazza
Players Choice: Outstanding NL Rookie
Todd Hollandsworth
Baseball Digest Rookie All-Star
Todd Hollandsworth
Silver Slugger Award
Mike Piazza
NL Pitcher of the Month
Hideo Nomo (September 1996)
NL Player of the Week
Hideo Nomo (Sep. 16–22)
Branch Rickey Award
Brett Butler

Farm system 

Teams in BOLD won League Championships

Major League Baseball draft

The Dodgers selected 79 players in this draft. Of those, seven of them would eventually play Major League baseball.

The top draft pick was third baseman Damian Rolls from Schlagel High School. He was selected by the Kansas City Royals in the 1999 Rule 5 draft and then traded to the Tampa Bay Devil Rays, where he played parts of five seasons with a .248 batting average, 9 homers and 73 RBI.

Shortstop Alex Cora was drafted in the third round out of the University of Miami. He would play 14 seasons in the Majors (7 of them with the Dodgers), primarily as a utility infielder/defensive replacement. He hit .243 in 1,273 games

The most successful player in this draft class was left-handed pitcher Ted Lilly from Fresno City College, who was drafted in the 23rd round. A two-time All-Star, he would play 15 seasons in the Majors (the last 4 with the Dodgers) and had a 130-113 record and 4.14 ERA in 356 games (331 starts).

References

External links 
1996 Los Angeles Dodgers uniform
Los Angeles Dodgers official web site 
Baseball-Reference season page
Baseball Almanac season page

Los Angeles Dodgers seasons
Los Angeles Dodgers
1996 in sports in California